Country Hills Boulevard is a major expressway in Calgary, Alberta. It is notably one of the longest east-west routes in Calgary and one few routes north of 16 Avenue N that is mostly continuous from the west end of the city to the east end. East of Calgary, Country Hills Boulevard continues as Alberta Highway 564. West of Calgary, it continues as Hamilton Drive as it passes through the Bearspaw Country Club. Country Hills Boulevard was originally named 112 Avenue N, and was a rural road in northeastern Calgary, but was renamed in the early 1990s when its namesake community of Country Hills, as well as Harvest Hills and Coventry Hills, were constructed.  Throughout the 1990s, the roadway was constructed in segments in northwest Calgary, departing from the original road allowance to follow the area's hilly topography.

A small segment of Country Hills Boulevard between Deerfoot Trail (Highway 2) and Barlow Trail was once designated as part of Highway 2A, but was decommissioned in the 1980s.

Major intersections
From west to east.

See also

Transportation in Calgary

References

Roads in Calgary